Mabad al-Khuzaah was a companion of Muhammad who helped him during the Invasion of Hamra al-Asad at Tihamah, in which Mabad pledged not to conceal anything from him. Mabad was then sent to Mecca to spread false information. In Mecca, Mabad met with Abu Sufyan and spread disinformation that Muhammad had gathered a great force to fight Abu Sufyan.  Abu Sufyan and his companions were planning a massive and decisive attack on Medina to finish off the Muslims once and for all. Hearing Mabad's talk of the great military strength of Muhammad, Abu Sufyan retreated from his plan of an immediate attack on the Muslims. In this fashion Muhammad successfully managed to prevent the massive onslaught the Meccans were planning.

He was trusted by both Muslims and Arab polytheists at the time according to the Muslim scholar Tabari.

See also
List of battles of Muhammad

References

Companions of the Prophet
Date of birth unknown
Date of death unknown
Place of birth unknown
Place of death unknown